GMG may refer to:

Gamecock Media Group
Garden Media Guild (formerly the Garden Writers' Guild), a British trade association for garden writers, photographers and broadcasters
Generalized Myasthenia Gravis
Girls Make Games, an American organization
Gizmodo Media Group
Global Migration Group, an inter-agency group working on international migration issues
GMG Airlines, an airline of Bangladesh, not in operation
GMG Community School District in Iowa
GNU MediaGoblin
Good Morning Gloucester, a daily report of life on the docks of "America's Oldest Seaport"
Green Man Gaming, an online retailer for PC video games
Grenade machine gun, an automatic grenade launcher
HK GMG, an automatic grenade launcher made by Heckler & Koch
Gregor-Mendel-Gymnasium, a college in Amberg/Germany
Guardian Media Group
GMG Radio, a division of the above